Thornback may refer to:

Fish
 Thornback guitarfish (Platyrhinoidis triseriata), a species of ray in the north-eastern Pacific Ocean
 Thornback ray (Raja clavata), also known as the Thorback skate, a species of ray in the Atlantic Ocean
 Thornback skate (Dentiraja lemprieri), a fish endemic to Australia

Other
 , a submarine
 Phaerimm, a fictional species of creatures in Dungeons & Dragons
 Spinster